Big Money Heavyweight is the fifth and final  studio album by hip hop duo Big Tymers. It was released on December 9, 2003, through Cash Money Records and was mainly produced by Mannie Fresh, with other production handled by R. Kelly, Jazze Pha and Leslie Brathwaite. The album debuted at number 21 on the Billboard 200 with first-week sales of 116,000 copies in the US and was certified Gold by the RIAA.

Track listing

Charts

Weekly charts

Year-end charts

References

2003 albums
Big Tymers albums
Cash Money Records albums
Albums produced by Mannie Fresh